Kathleen Robertson (born July 8, 1973) is a Canadian actress, producer, writer, and showrunner. She is best known for her roles as Kitty O'Neill in the Starz, Golden Globe-winning series Boss, Hildy Mulligan in TNT's Murder in the First, Tina Edison in the Canadian sitcom Maniac Mansion (1990–1993) and as Clare Arnold in the Fox teen drama series Beverly Hills, 90210 (1994–1997). Robertson also starred in a number of films, and from 2011 to 2012 played the role of Kitty O'Neill in the Starz political drama series Boss. From 2014 to 2016, Robertson starred as homicide detective Hildy Mulligan in the TNT series Murder in the First. In 2019, she played a main character in the series Northern Rescue.

Early life
Robertson was born in Hamilton, Ontario and attended Sherwood Secondary School and Hillfield Strathallan College, a local private school. She started taking acting classes when she was ten and had roles in local theatre productions. Her first television appearances were in The Campbells, My Secret Identity and E.N.G.

Career

Acting

From 1990 to 1993, Robertson starred as Tina Edison, the eldest of three children of Dr. Fred Edison (Joe Flaherty), on the Canadian sitcom Maniac Mansion. This role earned her two nominations for Young Artist Awards. She appeared in several small films and television shows, and did not debut on the big screen until her small role in the 1992 thriller film Blown Away, opposite Corey Haim and Nicole Eggert. She also made her American debut in the 1992 made-for-television movie, Quiet Killer, co-starring Kate Jackson.

In 1994, Robertson was cast in the series regular role of Clare Arnold in the Fox teen drama Beverly Hills, 90210. She starred in the show from 1994 to 1997, during seasons four to seven. In 1997, her ex-boyfriend, director Gregg Araki cast her as Lucifer, one of a group of bored, alienated, and very horny Los Angeles teens in the black comedy drama film Nowhere. She later had a role in his other film, called Splendor (1999). Robertson also has appeared in several films during her career. She appeared opposite Luke Wilson in romantic comedy Dog Park (1998), in Sally Field's directed comedy-drama Beautiful (2000), and the parody movie Scary Movie 2 (2001). She later had more serious roles with the 2002 acclaimed independent drama film XX/XY, opposite Mark Ruffalo. In the same year, Robertson played the role of Evelyn Dick, a Canadian convicted murderer, whose trial remains the most sensationalized event in Canadian criminal history, in the made-for-television movie, Torso: The Evelyn Dick Story. Robertson was nominated for a Gemini Award for her performance in the film.

In 2002, Robertson starred as one of the leads in the short-lived Fox legal drama series Girls Club created by David E. Kelley. She later appeared in a number of independent films, and had guest-starring roles on Law & Order: Criminal Intent, Medium, CSI: Miami, and Rookie Blue. In 2006, she appeared in Hollywoodland opposite Adrien Brody. From 2006 to 2007, she Executive Produced and had the leading role in the IFC comedy series, The Business. In 2007, she starred in the EMMY winning Syfy miniseries Tin Man as the primary antagonist of the story.

In 2011, she was cast as Kitty O'Neill, Tom Kane's personal aide alongside Kelsey Grammer in the Starz original drama series Boss. The series was cancelled after two seasons in late 2012. Robertson also starred in a number of made-for-television movies in recent years, primarily for Lifetime network, including Last Exit (2006), and Time of Death (2013). In 2013, Robertson portrayed the wife of hockey legend Gordie Howe in the made-for-television movie, Mr. Hockey: The Gordie Howe Story. The biopic first aired in late April on CBC, and then made its US debut the first week in May. Robertson won a Best Actress Leo Award for her role in the film.  

In 2013, Robertson was cast as the lead in the TNT detective drama series Murder in the First co-created by Steven Bochco which debuted on June 9, 2014. She plays the role of Hildy Mulligan, a homicide detective and single mother. In the same year she starred in the thriller film The Vatican Tapes that was released on February 27, 2015, and was cast in recurring role as Jodi Morgan for the second season of A&E drama series Bates Motel. In 2015, Robertson had the leading role alongside Eric Dane in the four-hour miniseries The Fixer.

In 2018, Robertson was cast in the Canadian Broadcasting Corporation and Netflix co-production drama series Northern Rescue. It was released on Netflix and CBC GEM on March 1, 2019.   In 2021, Robertson had a pivotal role in the final season of The Expanse as the right hand of Marcos Inaros.

Writing
In 2010s, Robertson added producing and screenwriting to her resume.  In 2015, Robertson completed the Writers Guild’s Showrunners Training Program, where she was mentored by former WGA West president John Wells. In 2017 she began adapting The Possibilities, Kaui Hart Hemmings’ follow up novel to The Descendants about a grieving Colorado mother whose son was killed in a skiing avalanche and then starts a friendship with a mysterious young girl. She is writing a feature drama film based on Chris Cleave’s novel, Little Bee starring Julia Roberts. In 2017, she began developing Swimming with Sharks, a series based on the 1994 Hollywood satire film. The series was set to debut in 2020 on the former Quibi platform. The series was later picked up by The Roku Channel and premiered at South by Southwest in March 2022. She also created comedy-drama pilot Your Time Is Up for Lifetime with Christina Applegate attached to star. 
As of 2022, Robertson is writing a film for Paramount and Akiva Goldsman for director Johannes Roberts. She also sold a new series to CBC called APRES SKI. She also sold a show to Lionsgate with Academy Award nominated doc filmmaker Joe Berlinger attached to direct.

Personal life
Robertson dated acclaimed independent filmmaker Gregg Araki from 1997 to 2000.

Robertson has been married to film producer Chris Cowles since 2004. They run a production company together called DEBUT CONTENT and have several films and television series in various stages of development. She gave birth to her first child, a son named William Robertson Cowles, on July 9, 2008, at Cedars-Sinai Medical Center in Los Angeles. In October 2016, Robertson gave birth to her second son, Bennett.

Filmography

Film (acting)

Television (acting)

Writing and producing 

 2007 - The Business, Executive Producer
 2022 - Swimming with Sharks, (TV Series), Producer, Executive Producer
 2022 - Swimming with Sharks, (TV Series), Episode 1.1, Writer
 TBA - Your Time Is Up, (TV Movie), Writer 
 TBA - Little Bee, (Screen Play), Writer

References

External links

1973 births
Living people
20th-century Canadian actresses
21st-century Canadian actresses
Actresses from Hamilton, Ontario
Canadian child actresses
Canadian expatriate actresses in the United States
Canadian film actresses
Canadian people of Irish descent
Canadian soap opera actresses
Canadian television actresses